Saint Guillaume is the French equivalent for Saint William. It may refer to the following place names:

 Saint-Guillaume, a commune in the Isère department in south-eastern France
 Saint-Guillaume, Quebec, a municipality in the Centre-du-Québec region of southwestern Quebec, Canada
 Saint-Guillaume-Nord, Quebec, an unorganized territory in the Lanaudière region of Quebec, Canada

See also
 Guillaume (disambiguation)